The TT Pro League awards is an annual awards ceremony commemorating football-related people, given at the conclusion of each TT Pro League season since its inauguration in 1999. The ceremony is held prior to the opening match of the following Pro League season. In addition to the annual Golden Boot recipient, the awards ceremony honours the Player, Manager, Referee, Assistant Referee, and Match Commissioner of the previous season. Beginning in 2005, the Pro League has also recognised the best position players of each season. The individual recipients are awarded Best Goalkeeper, Defender, Midfielder, and Forward. There are only two team award recipients each year: Best Team and Most Disciplined Team of the Year.

Award winners

Awards by club

See also
 TT Pro League Golden Boot
 List of TT Pro League seasons

References

External links
 Official Website
 Soca Warriors Online, TT Pro League

Awards